Mustafa Faraj was a prominent member of the Peshmerga, in northern Iraq during the Kurdish prolonged warfare with the Iraqi Government armed forces in their struggle for self-ruled northern Iraq.

Born in the village of Sanandaj in eastern Kurdistan in 1935, his mother died either during childbirth or when he was a very young child and his father remarried. His father would not take care of him, so Mustafa Faraj left his home. Mustafa Faraj's aunt adopted him and he grew up in the city of Shahrizor in Iraq. Later Mustafa Faraj moved to the city of Chamchamal, where he lived for many years. Mustafa Faraj started working at the local police of Mosul where he was promoted to a high rank. In the '70s Mustafa Faraj heard on the radio that Mustafa Barzani wanted to establish a free Kurdistan. When the came night he told his police group that he would look after them while they could sleep. He collected all of their weapons took the 20 men as hostages. He brought the police group and their weapons to Mustafa Barzani. After that he started his career as Peshmerga.

In the '70s Dr. Kemal Karkuki and his Peshmerga group were imprisoned in Baghdad, Mustafa Faraj kidnaped a high-ranked officer of the Iraqi regime. He exchanged the officer so Dr. Kemal Karkuki and his peshmerga group could be released from prison.

During a fight against Iraqi forces Mustafa Faraj was shot in his right arm, he could not go to a hospital in Iraq, so he went to Tehran in Iran where he was treated.

Even though there are some rumors, regarding his cause of death, the only thing surely known, is that he died in a fight between the Peshmerga and the Iraqi Armed forces in 1974. 

Mustafa Faraj had six children:
 - Sabria Mustafa Faraj
 - Aram Salah Mustafa Faraj
 - Layla Mustafa Faraj
 - Mina Mustafa Faraj
 - Mohammed Mustafa Faraj
 - Nahla Mustafa Faraj

His son Aram Salah Mustafa Faraj became a shahid in 1991, during raparin in Qara Hanjir, between Kerkuk and Sulaymaniyah. Mohammed Mustafa Faraj is currently still active within the Peshmerga. He fought at the frontline against ISIS in the Makhmur District, between Erbil Governorate and Nineveh Governorate, Iraq.

See also
Peshmerga
Mustafa Barzani
Kurdistan
Chamchamal
Kirkuk

1935 births
1974 deaths